Frank Hoste (born 29 August 1955, in Ghent) is a retired Belgian racing cyclist, who won the points classification in the Tour de France in 1984 as well as three stage victories. Hoste was a professional cyclist from 1977 to 1991, then he started a bicycle factory.

He rode in 13 grand tours throughout his career, eight times in the Tour de France and five times in the Giro d'Italia. All total he won five stages in the Tour de France and during the 1983 Giro d'Italia he came in the top 5 on eight different stages, one of which was a stage win.

Major results

1982
 Gent–Wevelgem
 Belgian cycling road championship
 Four Days of Dunkirk
 1982 Tour de France: 8th stage
1983
 Giro d'Italia: Stage 16A
 Tour de Suisse: Stages 1, 2 and 8
1984
 1984 Tour de France
Winner stages 1, 6 and 21
 Winner of the Points classification
 Grand Prix de Wallonie
 Hasselt-Spa-Hasselt
1985
 Giro d'Italia: Stage 6
1986
 1986 Tour de France: Stage 15
 GP Kanton Aargau Gippingen

References

External links
 Frank Hoste's bicycle factory
 

1955 births
Belgian male cyclists
Cyclists at the 1976 Summer Olympics
Olympic cyclists of Belgium
Belgian Tour de France stage winners
Belgian Giro d'Italia stage winners
Sportspeople from Ghent
Cyclists from East Flanders
Living people
Tour de Suisse stage winners
20th-century Belgian people